Thomas Falconer (1805–1882) was an English jurist and explorer.

Thomas Falconer may also refer to:

Thomas Falconer (scholar) (1772–1839), English clergyman and scholar
Thomas Falconer (classical scholar) (1738–1792), English classical scholar

See also
Thomas Falkner (1707–1784), English Jesuit missionary
Thomas Faulkner (disambiguation)